122nd may refer to:

122nd (Muskoka) Battalion, CEF, a unit in the Canadian Expeditionary Force during the First World War
122nd Delaware General Assembly, a meeting of the Delaware Senate and the Delaware House of Representatives
122nd Fighter Squadron, an active unit of the Louisiana Air National Guard which flies the F-15A Eagle
122nd meridian east, a line of longitude 122° east of Greenwich
122nd meridian west, a line of longitude 122° west of Greenwich
122nd Ohio Infantry, an infantry regiment in the Union Army during the American Civil War
122nd Rajputana Infantry, an infantry regiment of the British Indian Army
122nd Regiment of Foot (1762), an infantry regiment of the British Army, formed in 1762 and disbanded in 1764
122nd Regiment of Foot (1794), an infantry regiment of the British Army, formed in 1794 and disbanded in 1796
122nd Street (Manhattan), a cross street in the New York City borough of Manhattan running thirteen blocks from east to west
East 122nd Avenue, a MAX light rail station in Portland, Oregon
Ohio 122nd General Assembly, the legislative body of the state of Ohio in 1997 and 1998
Polish 122nd Fighter Escadrille  one of the fighter units of the Polish Army in 1939